Nesozineus is a genus of beetles in the family Cerambycidae, containing the following species:

 Nesozineus alphoides (Lane, 1977)
 Nesozineus amazonicus Martins & Galileo, 2010
 Nesozineus apharus Galileo & Martins, 1996
 Nesozineus armatus Galileo & Martins, 1996
 Nesozineus ateuchus Galileo & Martins, 1996
 Nesozineus bisignatus Hoffmann, 1984
 Nesozineus bucki (Breuning, 1954)
 Nesozineus clarkei Galileo & Martins, 2007
 Nesozineus fraterculus Hoffmann, 1984
 Nesozineus galapagoensis (Van Dyke, 1953)
 Nesozineus giesberti Galileo & Martins, 2007
 Nesozineus granosus Galileo & Martins, 1996
 Nesozineus griseolus Hoffmann, 1984
 Nesozineus juninensis (Lane, 1970)
 Nesozineus lineatus Galileo & Martins, 1996
 Nesozineus marmoratus Galileo & Martins, 1996
 Nesozineus obscurus Hoffmann, 1984
 Nesozineus peruanus Galileo & Martins, 2007
 Nesozineus probolus Galileo & Martins, 1996
 Nesozineus propinquus Hoffmann, 1984
 Nesozineus puru Galileo & Martins, 2007
 Nesozineus simile Galileo & Martins, 2006
 Nesozineus triviale Galileo & Martins, 1996
 Nesozineus unicolor Martins, Galileo & de-Oliveira, 2009
 Nesozineus zonatus Galileo & Martins, 1996

References

Acanthoderini